Freddy and the Melody of the Night is a 1960 West German musical film directed by Wolfgang Schleif and starring Freddy Quinn, Heidi Brühl and Peter Carsten.

The film was made by the revived UFA company. It was shot at the Tempelhof Studios in Berlin.

Cast
 Freddy Quinn as Freddy
 Heidi Brühl as Inge
 Peter Carsten as Karl Bachmann
 Kai Fischer as Anka
 Hans Nielsen as Direktor Wendlandt
 Grethe Weiser as Frau Bremer
 Harry Engel as Willi Bremer
 Werner Stock as Paul Kalinke
 Kunibert Gensichen as Heini
 Waltraut Runze
 Bruno W. Pantel as Kneipenbesucher
 Rolf Weih
 Willi Rose as Freddys Chef
 Herbert Weissbach as Onkel Hugo
 Heinz Holl
 Inge Prothmann
 Jürgen Feindt as Tänzer in Nachtclub
 Peter Schiff as Polizist in der Funkzentrale

References

Bibliography 
 Reimer, Robert C. & Reimer, Carol J. The A to Z of German Cinema. Scarecrow Press, 2010.

External links 
 

1960 films
West German films
German musical films
German crime films
1960 musical films
1960 crime films
1960s German-language films
Films directed by Wolfgang Schleif
Films set in Berlin
Films about taxis
UFA GmbH films
Films shot at Tempelhof Studios
1960s German films